Action Tae Kwon Do is a 1972 Hong Kong–Korean film. The film is also known by its Chinese title Zhan Bei Guo and by the Korean title  Hyopgi during its 1973 South Korean release. It was directed and produced by Yang Man Yi (楊曼怡). The film stars . In his first film appearance, Young-Moon Kwon stars in the film. Kwon is also an action director.

Plot 
The film is set in Korea in 1972. Living in the country, Japanese people behave lawlessly and bully the Koreans. Indignant at their behaviour, a group of people collaborate on fighting back. Through koto and sake, a duo of females beguile the Japanese men at the beginning of their scheme. A woman's fiancé, Hon San, begrudgingly participates in the rebellion. A group of male youths who are good at kicking join in on the scheme through Hon San's inadvertent efforts. A fierce fight starts after being triggered by the person who plays the koto.

Reception
Shin Min Daily News said that 's battle performances were "very outstanding".

Notes

References

External links
 
 Action Tae Kwon Do at Hong Kong Cinemagic
 

1970s action films
1972 films
1972 martial arts films
Hong Kong martial arts films
Mandarin-language films
Taekwondo films
1970s Hong Kong films